El Gen Argentino (Spanish for "The Argentine Gene") is an Argentine television programme aired on Telefe to determine who the public considered "the greatest Argentine in history". Premiered on 27 August 2007, it was a spin-off of the 2002 100 Greatest Britons series produced by the BBC. The Top 10 were announced on launch night, with almost 350,000 votes cast. In subsequent episodes, two candidates were chosen via an Internet vote for each of the five categories: sports, popular culture and journalism, 19th century politics, 20th century politics, and arts, sciences and humanities. On the last airing of the show, one personality among them was declared the winner.

Complete list

Facts
Nominees by area:
Political figures: 25.
Sports: 19.
Presidents: 13.
Music: 10.
Literature: 8.
Science: 7.
Television, cinema and radio: 7.
Painters and sculptors: 5.
Military figures: 4.
Religion: 2.
First Ladies: 1.
Aviators: 1.
Business and industry: 0.

References

Argentina
Lists of Argentine people
Telefe original programming